Valery Pisarev (born 30 June 1979) is a Kyrgyzstani former long-distance runner. He competed in the men's marathon at the 2004 Summer Olympics.

References

External links
 

1979 births
Living people
Athletes (track and field) at the 2004 Summer Olympics
Kyrgyzstani male long-distance runners
Kyrgyzstani male marathon runners
Olympic athletes of Kyrgyzstan
World Athletics Championships athletes for Kyrgyzstan
Place of birth missing (living people)
Athletes (track and field) at the 2006 Asian Games
Asian Games competitors for Kyrgyzstan